Stephen Oliver Welzig (November 29, 1941 – March 5, 2008), known as Stephen Oliver, was an American actor.

Biography 
Born in Philadelphia, Pennsylvania, Oliver portrayed the character of Lee Webber in the TV series Peyton Place from 1966 to 1968.  He later portrayed the character Tom Hudson in early episodes of Bracken's World (1970).  He made guest appearances in such other TV series as Starsky and Hutch, CHiPs, The Streets of San Francisco, and appeared in biker movies such as Motorpsycho (1965), Angels from Hell (1968), Werewolves on Wheels (1971) and Cycle Psycho (1973).  In addition, Oliver co-starred in drive-in films such as The Van (1977), and Malibu Beach (1978).

Personal life
Oliver was married 3 times:
Lana Wood (1966-1966; annulled)
Andrea Cyril (divorced)
Anna Geirstottir (divorced)

Death
He died on March 5, 2008, in Big Bear City, California at the age of 66 from stomach cancer.

Filmography

Film 
 1965 - Motorpsycho! as Brahmin
 1968 - Angels from Hell as Speed
 1971 - Werewolves on Wheels as Adam
 1973 - The Bloody Slaying of Sarah Ridelander as Chelsea Miller
 1975 - Fugitive Lovers as Blue Schuyler
 1977 - The Van as Dugan
 1978 - Malibu Beach as Dugan

Television 

 1966-1968 - Peyton Place as Lee Webber (143 episodes)
 1972-1976 - The Streets of San Francisco as Shandy / Mark Dillon / Bret Wilson
 1969-1970 - Bracken's World as Tom Hudson (26 episodes)
 1970 - The Immortal as Nat King
 1977 - Code R as Jacobson

External links

References 

1941 births
2008 deaths
American male film actors
American male television actors
Male actors from Philadelphia
Deaths from stomach cancer
Deaths from cancer in California
20th-century American male actors